Helliwell is a surname. Notable people with the surname include:

David Helliwell (born 1935), Canadian rower
Ian Helliwell (born 1962), English footballer
John Helliwell (born 1945), English musician: saxophonist, keyboardist and woodwind player for the rock band Supertramp
John R. Helliwell, British chrystallographer 
Luke Helliwell (born 1988), English rugby player
Robert Helliwell (1920–2011), electrical engineer and professor at Stanford University
Sid Helliwell (1904–1939), footballer
Wade Helliwell (born 1978), Australian basketball player

See also
Gordon & Helliwell, turn of the 20th century architectural firm based in Toronto, Ontario
Helliwell Hills or Usarp Mountains, major Antarctic mountain range, west of the Rennick Glacier
Helliwell Provincial Park, provincial park in British Columbia, Canada
Halliwell (disambiguation)
Halwell
Hellewell
Holwell (disambiguation)